Percy Appleyard (born 9 March 1935) is a former  Australian rules footballer who played with South Melbourne in the Victorian Football League (VFL).

Appleyard was captain / coach of the Lavington Football Club in 1959.

Notes

External links 

Living people
1935 births
Australian rules footballers from Victoria (Australia)
Sydney Swans players
Wodonga Football Club players